Riaz Bagwan (born 16 June 1960) was an Indian cricketer. He was a right-handed batsman and right-arm medium-pace bowler who played for Maharashtra. He was born in Bombay. Selector of Maharashtra Cricket Association

Bagwan, who had previously played for Maharashtra Schools and West Zone Schools in miscellaneous matches, made a single first-class appearance, during the 1983–84 season, against Saurashtra. Bagwan did not bat during the match, but bowled 5 overs, conceding 28 runs.

External links
Riaz Bagwan at ESPNCrickInfo
Riaz Bagwan at CricketArchive 

1960 births
Living people
Indian cricketers
Maharashtra cricketers
Cricketers from Mumbai